[[File:Marden theorem.svg|thumb|A triangle and its Steiner inellipse. The center green dot is the zero of . Marden's theorem states that the red dots are the foci of the ellipse.]]
In mathematics, Marden's theorem''', named after Morris Marden but proved about 100 years earlier by Jörg Siebeck, gives a geometric relationship between the zeroes of a third-degree polynomial with complex coefficients and the zeroes of its derivative. See also geometrical properties of polynomial roots.

Statement
A cubic polynomial has three zeroes in the complex number plane, which in general form a triangle, and the Gauss–Lucas theorem states that the roots of its derivative lie within this triangle. Marden's theorem states their location within this triangle more precisely:

The foci of that ellipse are the zeroes of the derivative {{math|p'(z)}}.

Additional relations between root locations and the Steiner inellipse
By the Gauss–Lucas theorem, the root of the double derivative  must be the average of the two foci, which is the center point of the ellipse and the centroid of the triangle.
In the special case that the triangle is equilateral (as happens, for instance, for the polynomial ) the inscribed ellipse becomes a circle, and the derivative of  has a double root at the center of the circle. Conversely, if the derivative has a double root, then the triangle must be equilateral .

Generalizations

Another generalization is to n-gons: some n-gons have an interior ellipse that is tangent to each side at the side's midpoint. Marden's theorem still applies: the foci of this midpoint-tangent inellipse are zeroes of the derivative of the polynomial whose zeroes are the vertices of the n-gon.

History
Jörg Siebeck discovered this theorem 81 years before Marden wrote about it.  However, Dan Kalman titled his American Mathematical Monthly'' paper "Marden's theorem" because, as he writes, "I call this Marden’s Theorem because I first read it in M. Marden’s wonderful book".

Dan Kalman won the 2009 Lester R. Ford Award of the Mathematical Association of America for his 2008 paper in the American Mathematical Monthly describing the theorem.

A short and elementary proof of Marden’s theorem is explained in the solution of an exercise in Fritz Carlson’s book “Geometri” (in Swedish, 1943).

See also 
Bôcher's theorem for rational functions

References 

 
 
 .
 
 ; 2005 pbk reprint with corrections
 
  hathitrust link

Theorems about triangles
Theorems about polynomials
Conic sections
Theorems in complex geometry